Gargettoscrancia is a monotypic moth genus in the family of Notodontidae. Its only species, Gargettoscrancia albolineata, is found in Equatorial Guinea and Ivory Coast. Both the genus and species were first described by Embrik Strand in 1912.

References

Strand, E. (1915). "Einige exotische, insbesondere afrikanische Heterocera". Archiv für Naturgeschichte. 81 (A)(2): 129–134.

Fauna of Equatorial Guinea
Fauna of Ivory Coast
Moths described in 1912
Moths of Africa
Notodontidae
Monotypic moth genera